The 1917 Geneva Covenanters football team was an American football team that represented Geneva College as an independent during the 1917 college football season. Led by first-year head coach Philip Henry Bridenbaugh, the team compiled a record of 5–3–1.

Schedule

References

Geneva
Geneva Golden Tornadoes football seasons
Geneva Covenanters football